Governor Noel may refer to:

Edmond Noel (1856–1927), 37th Governor of Mississippi
Philip Noel (born 1931), 68th Governor of Rhode Island